Lorne Kenneth Loomer (March 11, 1937January 1, 2017) was a Canadian competition rower and Olympic champion.

He received a gold medal in coxless fours at the 1956 Summer Olympics in Melbourne, together with Archibald MacKinnon, Walter D'Hondt and Donald Arnold. At the 1958 British Empire and Commonwealth Games, Loomer received a gold medal in eights.

Awards
Loomer was inducted into the Canadian Olympic Hall of Fame in 1958. He was inducted into British Columbia Sports Hall of Fame in 1966, and into University of British Columbia Sports Hall of Fame in 1993, together with the other members of the Olympic gold team. The Greater Victoria Sports Hall of Fame inducted Loomer in 1994.

Notes

Conflicting sources
Some sources list Loomer as a silver medallist in eights at the 1960 Summer Olympics in Rome, as a member of the Canadian team. However, according to other sources Loomer competed in coxless pairs, but was replaced by substitute David Anderson in the coxed eights.

References

External links

1937 births
2017 deaths
Canadian male rowers
Olympic rowers of Canada
Olympic gold medalists for Canada
Olympic silver medalists for Canada
Rowers at the 1956 Summer Olympics
Rowers at the 1960 Summer Olympics
People from Nelson, British Columbia
Olympic medalists in rowing
Medalists at the 1956 Summer Olympics
Commonwealth Games medallists in rowing
Commonwealth Games gold medallists for Canada
Rowers at the 1958 British Empire and Commonwealth Games
Medallists at the 1958 British Empire and Commonwealth Games